If Only' Jim is a 1920 American silent Western film directed by Jacques Jaccard and starring Harry Carey. The film is based on Philip Verrill Mighel's 1904 novel Bruvver Jim's Baby. It is not known whether the film currently survives, and it may be a lost film.

Plot 
There is a villain (Charles Brinley), who's after Jim Golden's (Harry Carey) gold, and a nice post mistress (Carol Holloway), who is willing to become both wife and mother. Universal surrounded their veteran western star, Harry Carey, with a fine supporting cast in this film, including former serial queen Carol Holloway as the post mistress, rotund comedy actor George Bunny, and one Minnie Prevost, a Native American supporting player who was billed as "Minnie Ha Ha" and had made an indelible impression with Mabel Normand in the 1918 film Mickey.

Cast 
 Harry Carey as Jim Golden
 Carol Holloway as Miss Dot Dennihan
 Ruth Royce as Miss Richards
 Duke R. Lee as Keno (credited as Duke Lee)
 Roy Coulson as Henry
 Charles Brinley as Parky
 George Bunny as Uncle Johnny
 Joseph Hazelton as Bill Bones
 Minnie Devereaux as Squaw (credited as Minnie Ha Ha)

See also
 Harry Carey filmography

References

External links

 
 

1920 films
1920 Western (genre) films
American black-and-white films
Films directed by Jacques Jaccard
Silent American Western (genre) films
Universal Pictures films
1920s American films
1920s English-language films